ACS Heniu Prundu Bârgăului, commonly known as Heniu Prundu Bârgăului, or simply Heniu, is a Romanian women's football club based in Prundu Bârgăului, Bistrița-Năsăud County, Romania. The team was founded in 2013 as the women's squad of Heniu Prundu Bârgăului, a club founded in 1938 that includes also a male football team.

Bârgăuancele continuously played in the Liga I, first tier of the Romanian women's football system, after promoting at the end of the 2013–14 season.

In the summer of 2022, the team was supposed to be taken over by the CS Gloria 2018 Bistrița-Năsăud club, which had more financial support. The move fell short due to identity issues, the main reason being the Heniu brand would have been suppressed in favor of the Gloria one. Heniu coach Călin Svoboda, along with a large part of the players opted to move to found the women's football section of Gloria 2018, while Heniu disbanded due to a combination of lack of players and financial support.

Honours

Leagues
Liga I
Runners-up (2): 2020–21, 2021–22

Liga II
Winners (1): 2013–14

Cups
Romanian Women's Cup
Runners-up (3): 2017–18, 2020–21, 2021–22

Season by season

Current squad

Club officials

Board of directors

 Last updated: 19 January 2019
 Source:

Current technical staff

 Last updated: 19 January 2019
 Source:

References

External links
 

Women's football clubs in Romania
Football clubs in Bistrița-Năsăud County
Association football clubs established in 2013
2013 establishments in Romania